Jesse F. Carter (September 12, 1873 – November 5, 1943) was an associate justice of the South Carolina Supreme Court. He was born to Miles McMillan Carter and Janie Kinard Carter. After local education for grade school, he attended Peabody College in Nashville, Tennessee, graduating in 1900. He periodically worked as a teacher between periods of study. He received his law degree from the University of South Carolina in 1905. He married Lydia Jenkins on October 3, 1911, in Barnwell County. He was active in the Democratic party and served as the chairman of its executive committee for eleven years. In 1925, he was elected to the South Carolina Senate from Bamberg County. He was elected an associate justice of the South Carolina Supreme Court in 1927 and served until his death on November 5, 1943.

References

Justices of the South Carolina Supreme Court
1873 births
People from Colleton County, South Carolina
1943 deaths
Place of death missing